Fränsta is a locality situated in Ånge Municipality, Västernorrland County, Sweden with  inhabitants, an area of  square kilometers and a population density of  inhabitants per km2.

References 

Populated places in Ånge Municipality
Medelpad